Zaragoza Club de Fútbol Femenino, formerly known as Club Deportivo Transportes Alcaine for sponsorship reasons, is a Spanish women's football team from Zaragoza playing in Segunda División Pro.

History

Zaragoza CFF was founded in 2002 after carrier company Transportes Alcaine bought Inter Aragón, which played in the lower categories. In 2005 the new team promoted to Superliga Femenina, the Spanish top league. After Grupo Prainsa became the main sponsor in 2007 and renamed the club as Prainsa Zaragoza, the main team consolidated itself in the first half of the table.

In 2009 the club performed their best season to date, ending 5th and playing the 2009 Copa de la Reina final. In the Cup competition, Alcaine lost to Espanyol.

Transportes Alcaine repeated success in 2013 by reaching their second Cup final. As in the previous final, the club was defeated by a four-goal margin, this time 0–4 against FC Barcelona.

On 26 September 2016 the club changed its name to Zaragoza Club de Fútbol Femenino.

Season by season

Titles

Invitational
 Lisbon Cup (1): 2015

Players

Current squad

Former internationals

  Spain: Vero Boquete, Silvia Meseguer, Sara Monforte, Mapi León, Marta Cardona, Esther Sullastres
  Paraguay: Gloria Villamayor
  Argentina: Mariela Coronel, Clarisa Huber
  Brazil: Andréia Suntaque, Darlene de Souza, Mayara Bordin
  Chile: Su Helen Galaz, Bárbara Santibáñez, Rocío Soto
  Colombia: Natalia Gaitán, Oriánica Velásquez
  Finland: Sanna Malaska
  Greece: Ioanna Chamalidou, Anastasia Spyridonidou
  Mexico: Mely Solís
  Montenegro: Armisa Kuč
  Namibia: Zenatha Coleman
  Norway: Maren Johansen
  Portugal: Ana Borges, Edite Fernandes, Jamila Marreiros, Sónia Matias, Cláudia Neto, Emily Lima
  Romania: Olivia Oprea
  Senegal: Korka Fall, Mamy N'Diaye
  Switzerland: Veronica Maglia
  United States: Lydia Hastings
  Zambia: Racheal Nachula, Hellen Mubanga
  Peru: Claudia Cagnina
  Morocco: Hanane Aït
  Venezuela: Lisbeth Castro

References

Women's football clubs in Spain
Association football clubs established in 2002
2002 establishments in Spain
Segunda Federación (women) clubs
Sport in Zaragoza
Football clubs in Aragon
Primera División (women) clubs